Huron Heights Secondary School may refer to:
 Huron Heights Secondary School (Kitchener)
 Huron Heights Secondary School (Newmarket)